Seal IV is the fourth studio album by Seal. It follows the aborted sessions for Togetherland, which was scrapped because Seal thought it was not up to the standard of his previous work.

In the United Kingdom, the album debuted at number four. In the United States, it debuted at number three on the US Billboard 200, making it his highest-charting album to date.

Track listing

Notes
 signifies a co-producer
 signifies additional production and remix

Personnel
Seal – vocals, keyboards, bass guitar, guitar
Jamie Muhoberac – keyboards, bass guitar
Mark Batson – keyboards, bass guitar, piano, Hammond organ, programming
Chris Bruce – bass guitar, guitar
Earl Harvin, Ian Thomas – drums
Luís Jardim – percussion
Trevor Horn – guitar, piano, bass guitar, keyboards
Gus Isidore, Tim Cansfield, Tim Pierce, Heitor Pereira, Steven McDonald – guitar
Charlie Russell – programming
Alan Griffiths – programming, guitar
Tessa Niles – backing vocals
Pete Murray – keyboards, piano
Carlos Rios – keyboards
Gavyn Wright – strings
Nick Ingman, Steve Sidwell – string, horn and choir arrangements

Charts

Certifications

References

External links

2003 albums
Seal (musician) albums
Albums produced by Trevor Horn
Warner Records albums